Inkai is a uranium mine located in Kazakhstan. Commercial production commenced in 2009, with the main processing plant being commissioned in 2010.

Inkai is a roll-front uranium deposit discovered in 1976. Uranium will be recovered using In-Situ Recovery (ISR) mining methods.

Reserves

As of December 31, 2013, proven and probable reserves are 59,689,700 tonnes at an average grade of 0.07% U3O8. (87.6 Million pounds)

Ownership

Inkai is owned and operated by Joint Venture Inkai (JVI), which is owned by Cameco Corporation(40%) and KazAtomProm(60%)

See also

Sandstone uranium deposits

References

Uranium mines in Kazakhstan
Solution mines in Kazakhstan